Natacha Rambova (born Winifred Kimball Shaughnessy; January 19, 1897 – June 5, 1966) was an American film costume designer, set designer, and occasional actress who was active in Hollywood in the 1920s. In her later life, she abandoned design to pursue other interests, specifically Egyptology, a subject on which she became a published scholar in the 1950s.

Rambova was born into a prominent family in Salt Lake City who were members of the Church of Jesus Christ of Latter-day Saints. She was raised in San Francisco and educated in England before beginning her career as a dancer, performing under Russian ballet choreographer Theodore Kosloff in New York City. She relocated to Los Angeles at age 19, where she became an established costume designer for Hollywood film productions. It was there she became acquainted with actor Rudolph Valentino, with whom she had a two-year marriage from 1923 to 1925. Rambova's association with Valentino afforded her a widespread celebrity typically afforded to actors. Although they shared many interests such as art, poetry and spiritualism, his colleagues felt that she exercised too much control over his work and blamed her for several expensive career flops.

After divorcing Valentino in 1925, Rambova operated her own clothing store in Manhattan before moving to Europe and marrying the aristocrat Álvaro de Urzáiz in 1932. It was during this time that she visited Egypt and developed a fascination with the country that remained for the rest of her life. Rambova spent her later years studying Egyptology and earned two Mellon Grants to travel there and study Egyptian symbols and belief systems. She served as the editor of the first three volumes of Egyptian Religious Texts and Representations (1954–7) by Alexandre Piankoff, also contributing a chapter on symbology in the third volume. She died in 1966 in California of a heart attack while working on a manuscript examining patterns within the texts in the Pyramid of Unas.

Rambova has been noted by fashion and art historians for her unique costume designs that drew on and synthesized a variety of influences, as well as her dedication to historical accuracy in crafting them. Academics have also cited her interpretive contributions to the field of Egyptology as significant. In popular culture, Rambova has been depicted in several films and television series, figuring significantly in the Valentino biopics The Legend of Valentino (1975), in which she was portrayed by Yvette Mimieux, and Ken Russell's Valentino (1977) by Michelle Phillips. She was also featured in a fictionalized narrative in the network series American Horror Story: Hotel (2015), portrayed by Alexandra Daddario.

Early life
Rambova was born Winifred Kimball Shaughnessy on January 19, 1897, in Salt Lake City, Utah. Her father, Michael Shaughnessy, was an Irish Catholic from New York City who fought for the Union during the American Civil War and then worked in the mining industry. Her mother, Winifred Shaughnessy (née Kimball), was the granddaughter of Heber C. Kimball, a member of the first presidency of the Church of Jesus Christ of Latter-day Saints, and was raised in a prominent Salt Lake City family. At her father's wishes, Rambova was baptized a Catholic at the Cathedral of the Madeleine in Salt Lake City in June 1897, though she later was baptized a member of the Church of Jesus Christ of Latter-day Saints at the urging of her mother at age eight.

Rambova's parents had a tumultuous relationship: Her father was an alcoholic, and often sold her mother's possessions to pay off gambling debts. This led Winifred (senior) to divorce Shaughnessy in 1900 and relocate with Rambova to San Francisco. There, she remarried to Edgar de Wolfe in 1907. During her childhood, Rambova spent summer vacations at the Villa Trianon in Le Chesnay, France with Edgar's sister, the French designer Elsie de Wolfe. The marriage between Winifred (senior) and Edgar de Wolfe was short-lived, and she again remarried, this time to millionaire perfume mogul Richard Hudnut. Rambova was adopted by her new stepfather, making her legal name Winifred Hudnut. Rambova was given the nickname "Wink" by her aunt Teresa to distinguish her from her mother because of their shared name. She also sometimes went by Winifred de Wolfe, after her former step-aunt Elsie, with whom she maintained a relationship after her mother's divorce from Edgar.

A rebellious teenager, Rambova was sent by her mother to Leatherhead Court, a boarding school in Surrey, England. In her schooling, she became fascinated by Greek mythology, and also proved especially gifted at ballet. After seeing Anna Pavlova in a production of Swan Lake in Paris with her former step-aunt Elsie, Rambova decided she wanted to pursue a career as a ballerina. Her family had encouraged her to study ballet purely as a social grace, and were appalled when she chose it as her career. Her aunt Teresa, however, was supportive, and took Rambova to New York City, where she studied under the Russian ballet dancer and choreographer Theodore Kosloff in his Imperial Russian Ballet Company. While dancing under Kosloff, she adopted the Russian-inspired stage name Natacha Rambova. Rambova's mother was outraged upon discovering the affair as Rambova was 17 years old at the time, and she tried to have Kosloff deported on statutory rape charges. Rambova retaliated against her mother by fleeing abroad, and her mother ultimately agreed to her continuing to perform with the company.

Career

Design in film

Around 1917, Kosloff was hired by Cecil B. DeMille as a performer and costume designer for DeMille's Hollywood films, after which he and Rambova relocated from New York to Los Angeles. Rambova carried out much of the creative work as well as the historical research for Kosloff, and he then stole her sketches and claimed credit for these as his own. When Kosloff started work for fellow-Russian film producer Alla Nazimova at Metro Pictures Corporation (later MGM) in 1919, he sent Rambova to present some designs. Nazimova requested some alterations, and was impressed when Rambova was able to make these changes immediately in her own hand. Nazimova offered Rambova a position on her production staff as an art director and costume designer, proposing a wage of up to USD$5,000 per picture. Rambova immediately began working for Nazimova on the comedy film Billions (1920), for which she supplied the costumes and served as art director. She also designed the costumes for two Cecil DeMille films in 1920: Why Change Your Wife? and Something to Think About. The following year, she served as the art director on the DeMille production Forbidden Fruit (1921), in which she designed (with Mitchell Leisen) an elaborate costume for a Cinderella-inspired fantasy sequence.

While working on her second project for Nazimova—Aphrodite, which never was filmed—Rambova revealed to Kosloff that she planned on leaving him. During the ensuing argument, he attempted to kill her, shooting at her with a shotgun. The gun fired into Rambova's leg, and the bullet lodged above her knee. Rambova fled the Hollywood apartment she shared with Kosloff to the set of Aphrodite, where a cameraman helped her remove the birdshot from her leg. Despite the nature of the incident, she continued to live with Kosloff for some time.

Stylistically, Rambova favored designers such as Paul Poiret, Léon Bakst, and Aubrey Beardsley. She specialized in "exotic" and "foreign" effects in both costume and stage design. For costumes she favored bright colors, baubles, bangles, shimmering draped fabrics, sparkles, and feathers. She also strived for historical accuracy in her costume and set designs. As noted in The Moving Picture Worlds review of 1917's The Woman God Forgot (Rambova's first film project): "To the student of history the accuracy of the exteriors, interiors, costumes, and accessories ... [the film] will make strong appeal."

Relationship with Rudolph Valentino

In 1921, Rambova was introduced to actor Rudolph Valentino on the set of Nazimova's Uncharted Seas (1921). She and Valentino subsequently worked together on Camille (1921), a film which was a financial failure and resulted in Metro Pictures terminating their contract with Nazimova. While making the film, however, Rambova and Valentino became romantically involved. Although Valentino was still married to American film actress Jean Acker, he and Rambova moved in together within a year, having formed a relationship based more on friendship and shared interests than on emotional or professional rapport. They then had to pretend to separate until Valentino's divorce was finalized, and married on May 13, 1922, in Mexicali, Mexico, an event described by Rambova as "wonderful ... even though it did cause many worries and heartaches later." However, the law required a year to pass before remarriage, and Valentino was jailed for bigamy, having to be bailed out by friends. They legally remarried on March 14, 1923, in Crown Point, Indiana.

Both Rambova and Valentino were spiritualists, and they frequently visited psychics and took part in séances and automatic writing. Valentino wrote a book of poetry, entitled Daydreams, with many poems about Rambova. When it came to domestic life, Valentino and Rambova turned out to hold very different views. Valentino cherished Old World ideals of a woman being a housewife and mother, while Rambova was intent on maintaining a career and had no intention of being a housewife. Valentino was known as an excellent cook, while actress Patsy Ruth Miller suspected Rambova didn't know "how to make burnt fudge," although the truth was she did occasionally bake and was an excellent seamstress. Valentino wanted children, but Rambova did not.

While her association with Valentino lent Rambova a celebrity typically afforded to actors, their professional collaborations showed-up their differences more than their similarities, and she did not contribute to any of his successful films in spite of serving as his manager. In The Young Rajah (1922) she designed authentic Indian costumes that tended to compromise his Latin lover image, and the film was a major flop. She also supported his one-man strike against Famous Players-Lasky, which left him temporarily banned from movie work. In the interval, they performed a promotional dance-tour for Mineralava Beauty Products, to keep his name in the spotlight, though when they reached her hometown of Salt Lake City, and she was billed as "The Little Pigtailed Shaughnessy Girl", Rambova was deeply insulted. In 1923, Rambova helped design the costumes for friend Alla Nazimova in Salomé, inspired by the work of Aubrey Beardsley. Beginning in February 1924, she accompanied Valentino on a trip abroad that was profiled in twenty-six installments published in Movie Weekly over the course of six months.

Rambova's later work with Valentino was characterised by elaborate and costly preparations for films that either flopped or never manifested. These included Monsieur Beaucaire, The Sainted Devil, and The Hooded Falcon (a film that Rambova co-wrote, but was never realized). By this time, critics and the press were beginning to blame Rambova's excessive control for these failures. United Artists went so far as to offer Valentino an exclusive contract with the stipulation that Rambova had no negotiating power, and was disallowed from even visiting the sets of his films. After this, Rambova was offered $30,000 to create a film of her choosing, which resulted in the production of What Price Beauty?, a drama which she co-produced and co-wrote. In 1925, Rambova and Valentino separated, and an acrimonious divorce ensued.

After the divorce proceedings began, Rambova moved on to other ventures: On March 2, 1926, she patented a doll she had designed with a "combined coverlet", and also produced and starred in her own picture, Do Clothes Make the Woman? with Clive Brook (now lost). However, the distributor took the opportunity to bill her as 'Mrs. Valentino' and changed the title to When Love Grows Cold; Rambova was horrified by the title change. The film did garner press due to it being Rambova's first screen credit, however. An Oregon newspaper teased before a screening: "Natacha Rambova (Mrs. Rudolph Valentino) ... So much has been written of this remarkable lady who won and lost the heart of the great Valentino that everyone wants to see her. Tonight is your opportunity to do so." The film, however, was not well received by critics; a review in Picture Play deemed the film "the poorest picture of the month, or of almost any month, for that matter," adding: "The interiors are bad, the costumes atrocious. Miss Rambova is not well dressed, nor does she film well, in the slightest degree." After its release, Rambova never worked in film, on or offscreen, again. Three months later, Valentino died unexpectedly of peritonitis, leaving Rambova inconsolable, and she purportedly locked herself in her bedroom for three days. Though she did not attend his funeral, she sent a telegram to Valentino's business manager George Ullman, requesting he be buried in her family crypt at Woodlawn Cemetery in the Bronx (a request Ullman denied).

Writing and fashion design
After Valentino's death, Rambova relocated to New York City. There, she immersed herself in several endeavors, appearing in vaudeville at the Palace Theatre and writing a semi-fictional play entitled All that Glitters, which detailed her relationship with Valentino, and concluded in a fictionalized happy reconciliation. She also published the 1926 memoir, Rudy: An Intimate Portrait by His Wife Natacha Rambova, which contains memories of her life with him. The following year, a second memoir was published entitled Rudolph Valentino Recollections (a variation of Rudy: An Intimate Portrait), in which she prefaces an addended final chapter by asking that only those "ready to accept the truth" read on; what follows is a detailed letter supposedly communicated by Valentino's spirit from an astral plane, which Rambova claimed to have received during an automatic writing session. While residing in New York, she frequently arranged séances with medium George Wehner, and claimed to have made contact with Valentino's spirit on several occasions. Rambova also appeared in supporting parts in two original 1927 Broadway productions: Set a Thief, a drama written by Edward E. Paramore, Jr., and Creoles, a comedy written by Kenneth Perkins and Samuel Shipman. 

In June 1928, she opened an elite couture shop on Fifth Avenue and West 55th street in Manhattan, which sold Russian-inspired clothing that Rambova herself designed. Her clientele included Broadway and Hollywood actresses such as Beulah Bondi and Mae Murray. On opening the shop, she commented: "I'm in business, not exactly because I need the money, but because it enables me to give vent to an artistic urge." In addition to clothing, the shop also carried jewelry, although it is unknown if it was designed by Rambova or imported. By late 1931, Rambova had grown uneasy about the economic situation of the United States during the Great Depression, and feared the country would experience a drastic revolution. This led her close her shop and formally retire from commercial fashion design, leaving the United States to live in Juan-les-Pins, France in 1932. On a yacht cruise to the Balearic Islands, she met her second husband Álvaro de Urzáiz, a British-educated Spanish aristocrat, whom she married in 1932. They lived together on the island of Mallorca and restored abandoned Spanish villas for tourists, a venture financed by Rambova's inheritance from her stepfather.

It was during her marriage to Urzáiz that Rambova first toured Egypt in January 1936, visiting the ancient monuments in Memphis, Luxor, and Thebes. While there, she met archeologist Howard Carter, and became fascinated by the country and its history, which had a profound effect on her. "I felt as if I had at last returned home," she said. "The first few days I was there I couldn't stop the tears streaming from my eyes. It was not sadness, but some emotional impact from the past–a returning to a place once loved after too long a time." Upon returning to Spain, Urzáiz became a naval commander for the pro-fascist nationalist side during the Spanish Civil War. Rambova fled the country to a familial château in Nice, where she suffered a heart attack at age forty. Soon after, she and Urzáiz separated.  Rambova remained in France until the Nazi invasion in June 1940, upon which she returned to New York.

Egyptology and scholarly work
Rambova's interest in the metaphysical evolved significantly during the 1940s, and she became an avid supporter of the Bollingen Foundation, through which she believed she could see a past life in Egypt. Rambova was also follower of Helena Blavatsky and George Gurdjieff, and conducted classes in her Manhattan apartment about myths, symbolism and comparative religion. She also began publishing articles on healing, astrology, yoga, post-war rehabilitation, and numerous other topics, some of which appeared in American Astrology and Harper's Bazaar. In 1945, the Old Dominion (a predecessor to the Andrew W. Mellon Foundation) awarded Rambova a grant-in-aid of USD$500 for "making a collection of essential cosmological symbols for a proposed archive of comparative universal symbolism." Rambova intended to use her research to generate a book, which she wanted Ananda Coomaraswamy to write, with the principal themes derived from astrology, theosophy, and Atlantis. In an undated letter to Mary Mellon, she wrote:

Rambova's intellectual investment in Egypt also led her to undertake work deciphering ancient scarabs and tomb inscriptions, which she began researching in 1946. Initially, she believed she would find evidence of a connection between ancient Egyptian belief systems and those of ancient American cultures. While researching at the Institut Français d'Archéologie Orientale in Cairo, she met the institute's director, Alexandre Piankoff, with whom she established a rapport based on their shared interest in Egyptology. Piankoff introduced her to his French translation of the Book of Caverns, a royal funerary text, which he was working on at the time. "To my amazement, I found that it contains all the most important esoteric material," Rambova wrote. "I can only compare it to the Coptic Pistis Sophia, the Tibetan Voice of the Silence, and the Hindu Sutras of Patanjali. It is what I have been looking for for years."

Her interest in the Book of Caverns led her to abandon her studies of scarabs, and she began translating Piankoff's French translation into English, an endeavor she felt "was the main purpose and point" of her studies in Egypt. She secured a second two-year grant of US$50,000 through the Mellon and Bollingen Foundations (a considerably large grant for the time) to help Piankoff photograph and publish his work on the Book of Caverns. In the winter of 1949–50, she joined Piankoff and Elizabeth Thomas in Luxor to undertake further studies. In the spring of 1950, the group was given permission to photograph and study inscriptions on golden shrines that had once enclosed the sarcophagus of Tutankhamun, after which they toured the Pyramid of Unas at Saqqara.

After completing the expedition in Egypt, Rambova returned to the United States, where, in 1954, she donated her extensive collection of Egyptian artifacts (accumulated over years of research) to the University of Utah's Museum of Fine Arts (UMFA). She settled in New Milford, Connecticut, where she spent the following several years working as an editor on the first three volumes of Piankoff's series Egyptian Texts and Religious Representations, which was based on the research he had done with Rambova and Thomas. The first volume was The Tomb of Ramesses VI published in 1954, followed by The Shrines of Tut-Ankh-Amon in 1955. During this time, she kept regular correspondence with fellow Egyptologists William C. Hayes and Richard Parker.

For the third volume of Piankoff's series, Mythological Papyri (published in 1957), Rambova contributed her own chapter in which she discussed semiotics in Egyptian papyri. Rambova continued to write and research intensely into her sixties, often working twelve hours per day. In the years prior to her death, she was working on a manuscript examining texts from the Pyramid of Unas for a translation by Piankoff. This manuscript, which exceeds a thousand pages, was donated to the Brooklyn Museum after her death. Two additional manuscripts were also left behind, which are part of Yale University's Yale in Egypt collection: The Cosmic Circuit: Religious Origins of the Zodiac and The Mystery Pattern in Ancient Symbolism: A Philosophic Interpretation.

Later life and death
In the early 1950s Rambova developed scleroderma, which significantly affected her throat, impeding her ability to swallow and speak.

In 1957, Rambova moved to New Milford, Connecticut, and devoted her time to researching a comparative study of ancient religious symbolism, which she continued virtually unabated until her death.

She grew delusional, believing that she was being poisoned, and quit eating, resulting in malnourishment. On September 29, 1965, she was discovered going "berserk" in a hotel elevator in Manhattan. Rambova was admitted to Lenox Hill Hospital, where she was diagnosed with paranoid psychosis brought on by malnutrition.

With her health in rapid decline, Rambova's cousin, Ann Wollen, relocated her from her home in Connecticut to California, in order to help take care of her. There, Rambova was admitted to Methodist Hospital in Arcadia. On January 19, 1966 (her 69th birthday), she was relocated to a nursing home at Las Encinas Hospital in Pasadena. She died there six months later of a heart attack on June 5, 1966, at the age of 69. At her wishes, Rambova was cremated, and her ashes were scattered in a forest in northern Arizona.

Claims regarding personal life

Claims that Rambova was bisexual or homosexual date back to at least 1975 when they appeared in Kenneth Anger's notoriously libelous Hollywood Babylon, in which it is written that Rambova claimed to have never consummated her marriage with Rudolph Valentino. This has led some historians to refer to the couple's union as a "lavender marriage." The claim, however, is at odds with the grounds of Valentino's 1922 arrest after the couple's wedding: he was arrested and jailed for consummating the marriage in Palm Springs, California despite still being legally married to Jean Acker. Discussion of Rambova's sexuality continued to appear in academic and biographical texts throughout the 1980s and beyond.

The basis of the claim is an alleged relationship Rambova had with Alla Nazimova, her friend and peer while Rambova was beginning her career in film design. Similar inferences have been made about others in Nazimova's social circle, including Marlene Dietrich, Eva Le Gallienne, and Greta Garbo.

Whether Rambova was bisexual or homosexual is unclear; some have disputed such claims, including journalist David Wallace, who dismisses it as rumor in his 2002 book Lost Hollywood. Biographer Morris also disputes the claim, writing in his epilogue of Madam Valentino that "the convenient ... allegation that Rambova was a lesbian collapses when one scrutinizes the facts." Additionally, a close friend of writer Mercedes de Acosta (also an alleged lover of Nazimova) told Morris that she believed Rambova and Nazimova's relationship was nothing other than platonic. Rambova's friend Dorothy Norman also stated that Rambova had been "displeased" by De Acosta's controversial 1960 autobiography, which implied she was bisexual or homosexual, as it had "cast her in an improper light." In his 1996 book The Silent Feminists, Anthony Slide stated that "all who [knew] Rambova deny that she was a gay woman."

Cultural significance

Design and fashion

Rambova was one of the few women in Hollywood during the 1920s to serve as a head art designer in film productions. At the time, her costume and set designs were considered "highly stylized," and divided opinion among critics. A 1925 Picture Play magazine profile on What Price Beauty? noted the "bizarre" effects present, adding: "Miss Rambova insists the picture will be popular in its appeal, and not, as one might think, "arty."" Rambova's sets incorporated shimmering shades of silver and white against sharp "moderne" lines, and blended elements of Bauhaus and Asian-inspired geometries.

Commenting on her career in film, design historian Robert La Vine proclaimed Rambova one of the "most inventive designers ... ever," also noting her as one of few who crafted both sets and costumes. Film historian Robert Klepper wrote of her designs in Camille (1921): "In evaluating the film today, one has to give art director Natacha Rambova her due credit for her vision as an artist. The deco sets are beautiful, and the ultra modern design was far ahead of its time. Although Rambova may have influenced her future husband Valentino to make some bad business decisions, her talent as an artist cannot be denied." Historian Pat Kirkham also praised her contributions to film, writing that she created "some of the most visually unified films in Hollywood history." Costume historian Deborah Landis named Rambova's white rubberized tunic (worn by Alla Nazimova) and the Art Deco-inspired imagery of Salome (1922) among the "most memorable in motion picture history."

Though her work in both set and costume design has been deemed influential by film and fashion historians alike, Rambova herself claimed to "loathe fashion," adding: 

Thus, Rambova's approach to fashion design in her post-film career was conscious of the individual, a practice which fashion historian Heather Vaughan suggests was carried over from her past designing movie costumes for "individual character types." Vaughan adds: "While not necessarily an innovator of fashion, her Hollywood cachet and ability to synthesize fashion and traditional cultures allowed her to create designs and a personal style that continues to fascinate."

Rambova's clothing designs drew on various influences, described by fashion critics as blending and re-working elements of Renaissance, 18th-century, Oriental, Grecian, Russian, and Victorian fashion. Common preferences in her work included the dolman sleeve, long skirts with high waists, premium velvets, and intricate embroidery, as well as incorporation of geometric shapes and use of "vivid colors ... that are violent and definite. Scarlets, vermilions, strong blues, [and] blazoning purples." She was cited as influential by several designers with whom she worked, including Norman Norell, Adrian, and Irene Sharaff. Rambova typically dressed in the style of her designs, and thus her personal style was also influential: She often wore her hair in coiled "ballerina style" braids, sometimes covered in a headscarf or turban, with dangling earrings and calf-length velvet or brocade skirts. Actress Myrna Loy once proclaimed Rambova the "most beautiful woman she'd ever seen." In 2003, Rambova was posthumously inducted into the Costume Designers' Guild Hall of Fame.

Scholarly influence
Rambova's scholarly work has been regarded as significant by contemporary academics in the fields of Egyptology and history: archaeologist Barbara Lesko notes that her contribution to Piankoff's Mythological Papyri "demonstrates her organizational skills and her commitment to searching out truths and does not reek of unfounded theories or other eccentricity." Rambova's research, specifically her metaphysical interpretations of texts, has been deemed useful by Egyptologists Rudolph Anthes, Edward Wente, and Erik Hornung. In the 1950s, Rambova donated her extensive collection of Egyptian artifacts to the University of Utah, displayed in the Utah Museum of Fine Arts's Natacha Rambova Collection of Egyptian Antiquities. Both Rambova and her mother were credited as "vital" to the establishment of the museum through their donations of paintings, furniture, and artifacts.

Depictions in art and film
Rambova has been depicted across several mediums, including visual art, film, and television: She was the subject of a 1925 painting by Serbian artist Paja Jovanović (donated by her mother to the UMFA in 1949). In 1975, she was portrayed by Yvette Mimieux in Melville Shavelson's television film The Legend of Valentino (1975), and again by Michelle Phillips in Ken Russell's feature film Valentino (1977). Ksenia Jarova later portrayed her in the American silent film Silent Life (2016), and she also figured in a fictionalized narrative in the network series American Horror Story: Hotel (2015), played by Alexandra Daddario.

Filmography

§ Indicates surviving films

Stage credits

Bibliography

Authored works

Rambova, Natacha (February 1942 – June 1943). "Astrological Psycho-Chemistry". American Astrology.

Edited works

Notes

References

Works cited

Further reading

 Vaughan, Heather, "Personality and Style: The Fashion Career of Natacha Rambova," September 11, 2004 to February 6, 2005. (Co-curator/Guest-Curator) Phoenix Art Museum, Fashion Design Gallery, Phoenix, AZ. www.fashionhistorian.net

 Zumaya, Evelyn, Affairs Valentino. The Rudolph Valentino Society and Publishing LLC, 2011.

External links
 
 Natacha Rambova at the Women Film Pioneers Project, Columbia University
 Scan of article on Rambova in Dress (Vol. 33), 2006, Costume Society of America
Natacha Rambova papers at the Library of Congress
 Catalog of artifacts donated by Rambova to the University of Utah (from the Utah Museum of Fine Art's Ancient Egyptian Art collection)
 The Natacha Rambova Archive at Yale University (Yale in Egypt collection)

1897 births
1966 deaths
20th-century American actresses
20th-century astrologers
Actresses from Salt Lake City
American art directors
American astrologers
American costume designers
American Egyptologists
American fashion designers
American film producers
American Latter Day Saints
20th-century American memoirists
American people of Irish descent
American scenic designers
American silent film actresses
American spiritualists
American stage actresses
American women film producers
American women screenwriters
Artists from Salt Lake City
Artists from San Francisco
Dancers from California
Dancers from Utah
Screenwriters from California
Screenwriters from Utah
Writers from Salt Lake City
Writers from San Francisco
Women film pioneers
Women scenic designers
American women memoirists
Women graphic designers
Rudolph Valentino
20th-century American women writers
American women archaeologists
American women fashion designers
20th-century American screenwriters